The women's 200 metres at the 2017 Asian Athletics Championships was held on 7 July.

Medalists

Results

Heats

Qualification rule: First 2 in each heat (Q) and the next 2 fastest (q) qualified for the final.

Wind:Heat 1: +1.3 m/s, Heat 2: +1.3 m/s, Heat 3: -0.9 m/s

Final
Wind: -0.6 m/s

References

200
200 metres at the Asian Athletics Championships